Music for Pleasure is the debut studio album by rock band Monaco, a side project of New Order bassist Peter Hook. It was released in 1997 and reached No. 11 in the UK. The album sold more than 500,000 copies worldwide, with its first single, "What Do You Want from Me?", often mistaken for a New Order song. The band recorded one more album before dissolving in 2000.

"What Do You Want from Me?" was one of two hit singles in the UK. It reached No. 11 in March 1997, while "Sweet Lips" hit No. 18, in May.

The cover is designed by Peter Saville and the cover photograph was taken by Sam Taylor-Wood.

Track listing 
All songs by Peter Hook and David Potts.

 "What Do You Want from Me?" – 4:09
 "Shine" – 5:32
 "Sweet Lips" – 4:11
 "Buzz Gum" – 6:05
 "Blue" – 2:40
 "Junk" – 9:14
 "Billy Bones" – 4:59
 "Happy Jack" – 4:12
 "Tender" – 4:34
 "Under the Stars" - 3:52 (not on UK release)
 "Sedona" – 6:54 
("Sedona" ends at 5:50. After one minute of silence, a brief spoken message by Hook - "Oi! You can turn it off now." - plays.)

Personnel 
 Peter Hook – bass guitar, vocals
 David Potts – drums, guitar, keyboards, vocals, bass

Charts

References 

1997 debut albums
Monaco (band) albums
Polydor Records albums